The Holden Sandman is a sports coupé utility produced between 1974 and 1980 by General Motors' Australian subsidiary Holden and became known throughout the 1970s as "Shaggin' Wagons", given their popularity amongst teenage couples, identified by their bright paint jobs and distinguishable stripes, and later the colourful "SANDMAN" lettering covering the tailgate, the Sandman was Holden's answer to a Panel Van and Utility variant of the popular GTS variants of the Sedan and Monaro Coupé, The sandman came standard with the GTS' sports style gauge cluster, sports steering wheel, bucket  seats, along with a fully furnished interior, and the exterior consisting of rally wheels, GTS style guards, "Sandman" Logo painted on B pillars for utes and in approximately the same spot on panel vans and exclusive vinyl stripes, the Sandman came with a standard 173 cubic inch "red" inline 6, however most were optioned with either a 253, or 308 cubic inch Holden V8 (as Chevrolet small-block engines were not an option, unlike their GTS counterparts), backed by either a 4 speed manual (Standard) or 3 Speed 'Tri-Matic' Automatic, both controlled through a console mounted floorshift.

Ford Australia released its XB Falcon Surferoo and Surfsider and later a range of Sundowner vans to try and take a share of the Sandman's popularity, however did not succeed. Valiant-Chrysler Australia also released its CL Valiant Drifter, to similar praise.

The Sandman is often referred to among enthusiasts by its Production Order (PO) code, "XX7".

Holden Commodore Sandman 

In 2015, the Sandman nameplate was revived with a limited edition version of the Commodore SportWagon and Ute decorated with HX-HZ style stripes, a custom "Sandman" dashpad, 20inch Baretta wheels and sheepskin seat covers, The Sandman was available in SV6 or SS V Redline spec, with a Holden High-Feature "LFX" V6, or for the latter, a Chevrolet "LS3" small-block V8.

References 

Holden vehicles
General Motors vehicles